Kiteboating or kite boating is the act of using a kite rig as a power source to propel a boat. Kiteboating is a type of surface water sport, but it also has transportation uses

Equipment
Kiteboating uses different types of gear from kitesurfing. Kites attached to boats can be larger than kites attached to a surfer. For long voyages, the kite rig must be more autonomously controlled. Due to the lifting power of kites, they are often used with hydrofoils.

Current kite rigs can be sailed within 50 degrees of the wind. Placing turbines in the boat's hull can let the kite power generate electricity on board.

History
Going back to 1800s, George Pocock used the kites in order to increase the size of propel carts that are found in land and boats. Sébastien Cattelan is the French kitesurfer was the first sailor who was able to break 50 knots, achieving 50.26 knots on 3 October 2008 at the Lüderitz Speed Challenge in Namibia. Next, on 14 November 2009, Alex Caizergues achieved a speed of 50.98 knots in Namibia.

Patents 
 US Patent 6003457 Boat powered by means of a kite via a hinged arm by Pierre Chatelain. Filed:April 1, 1998.

See also 
 Kite rig
 Kite types
 Kitesurfing
 SkySails
 Power kite

References

External links 
 Kiteboating enthusiast website
 Kitetender
 Oceankiteboat
 Beginners kiteboating
 Wingit kiteboat systems

Kites
Boating